Son of Lassie (also known as Laddie, Son of Lassie) is a 1945 American Technicolor feature film produced by MGM based on characters created by Eric Knight, and starring Peter Lawford, Donald Crisp, June Lockhart and  Pal (credited as Lassie). A sequel to Lassie Come Home (1943), the film focuses on the now adult Joe Carraclough after he joins the Royal Air Force during World War II and is shot down over Nazi-occupied Norway along with a stowaway, Lassie's son "Laddie" – played by Pal. Son of Lassie was released theatrically on April 20, 1945, by Loew's.

Plot 
In Yorkshire, at the estate of the Duke of Rudling (Nigel Bruce), the British Army converted the grounds into a training camp for war dogs. The camp is placed under the supervision of Sam Carraclough (Donald Crisp), the kennel caretaker, who immediately begins the process of selecting the best dogs for training, including Laddie, the young pup of the champion collie, Lassie. Joe Carraclough (Peter Lawford), now an adult, joins the Royal Air Force (RAF) during the Second World War. Departing for training school, he is forced to leave behind his dog Lassie and her pup, Laddie.

Laddie, being considered as a "war dog", follows Joe to training school and then stows away on his master's bomber, just as it takes off on a dangerous mission over Nazi-occupied Norway. The two are forced to parachute when hit by enemy fire. Laddie then seeks help for his injured master. While they are separated, Joe is captured, and the dog is pursued by enemy soldiers. Laddie is sheltered, first by young Norwegian children who find him, and later by a freedom-fighter who is killed. Laddie finally reaches the prisoner-of-war camp where his master had been taken.

The German guards use Laddie to seek out his master who had escaped. In his search for Joe, who is forced into a labor detail on a coastal gun emplacement, Laddie is reunited with his master and thereafter the two race for their lives to reach friendly lines as the Nazis pursue them. Finally free, both Joe and Laddie make their way back to the Rudling estate to reunite with Lassie, Sam Carraclough, Joe's father and Priscilla (June Lockhart), the Duke of Rudling's granddaughter.

Cast 

 Pal (credited as "Lassie") as Lassie and grown-up Laddie
 Peter Lawford as Joe Carraclough
 Donald Crisp as Sam Carraclough, Joe's father
 June Lockhart as Priscilla, the Duke of Rudling's granddaughter
 Nigel Bruce as Duke of Rudling, grandfather to Priscilla
 Donald Curtis as Sgt. Eddie Brown
 Robert Lewis as Sgt. Schmidt
 Nils Asther as Olav
 William Severn as Henrik
 Leon Ames as Anton
 Fay Helm as Joanna
 Terry Moore as Thea (as Helen Koford, her birth name)

Production 
Produced under the working title, Laddie, Son of Lassie, the film originally had Elsa Lanchester playing the role of the adult Priscilla. Shortly after filming began, June Lockhart took over the role. It was the first movie filmed using the Technicolor Monobook method.

Principal filming took place from May 22 to mid-November 1944, in various locations throughout western Canada, including Vancouver Island and Christopher Point in British Columbia and Banff National Park in Alberta. Other locations included Jackson Hole, Wyoming and Los Angeles in the United States.

The wartime airfield scenes were shot at the air base at Patricia Bay which is now Victoria International Airport. The aircraft used included Curtiss P-40 Warhawk fighters, Bristol Bolingbroke and Lockheed Ventura bombers of the Royal Canadian Air Force.

According to The Hollywood Reporter, John Charles Reed sued MGM in October 1947 for plagiarism, claiming the film script was based on his 1943 story "Candy". The jury disagreed and the suit was dismissed.

Son of Lassie reportedly popularized the name "Lad" for male dogs. Pal, the original male collie who played Lassie in Lassie Come Home (1943) played Laddie. A 20-year-old June Lockhart, whose screen career had consisted of bit parts, had a more meaningful connection to the iconic Lassie story when in 1958, she took on the role of Ruth Martin, who adopts orphan Timmy (Jon Provost) in the long-running TV series Lassie.

Music 
In 2010, Film Score Monthly released the complete scores of the seven Lassie feature films released by MGM between 1943 and 1955 as well as Elmer Bernstein's score for It's a Dog's Life (1955) in the CD collection Lassie Come Home: The Canine Cinema Collection, limited to 1000 copies. Due to the era when these scores were recorded, nearly half of the music masters have been lost so the scores had to be reconstructed and restored from the best available sources, mainly the Music and Effects tracks as well as monaural ¼″ tapes.

The score for Son of Lassie was composed by Herbert Stothart. Many of the Norwegian scenes use themes from Norwegian composer Edvard Grieg, notably the Piano Concerto and the Peer Gynt Suite.

Track listing for Son of Lassie (Disc 2)

 Main Title/Laddie (beginning)* - 2:14 
 Mischievous Puppy/My First Cake - 3:42 
 Say It/Rudling Kennels - 3:24 
 Training Routine (Stothart–Castelnuovo-Tedesco) - 2:41 
 That’s Where His Heart Is/Lowering the Colors - 2:20 
 Bull Terrier/Infraction of Regulations - 3:13 
 Laddie at Airfield & Waiting Dog (Stothart–Castelnuovo-Tedesco) - 3:21 
 Planes Taxiing/Plane Overdue - 4:52 
 Parachute Landing (Stothart–Castelnuovo-Tedesco) - 4:20 
 Underground (Stothart–Castelnuovo-Tedesco)/Disconsolate Laddie (damaged) (Stothart–Castelnuovo-Tedesco) - 4:14 
 Occupied Village/Locked Storage - 3:40 
 Injured Dog* (Castelnuovo-Tedesco)/Of Viking Ancestry - 5:49 
 It Should Be Christmas -  0:54 
 Frantic Dog (Castelnuovo-Tedesco) - 4:43 
 Leading the Blind (Stothart–Castelnuovo-Tedesco) - 1:15 
 Reprise (Stothart–Castelnuovo-Tedesco) - 1:14 
 Passport - 2:13 
 It’s Laddie (Stothart–Castelnuovo-Tedesco) - 0:40 
 Seeking His Master (Stothart–Castelnuovo-Tedesco) - 1:41 
 Clown Sergeant/The Escape (Stothart–Castelnuovo-Tedesco)/Through the Rapids (Castelnuovo-Tedesco) - 8:34 
 Back to the Yorkshire Moors - 0:38 
 Final Episode - 2:04 
Overseas Title - 0:15

Contains Sound Effects

Total Time: 68:48

Release 
Son of Lassie was released to theaters on April 20, 1945. A VHS home video release came on September 1, 1998. It was first released to Region 1 DVD by Warner Home Video on August 24, 2004. It was re-released on November 7, 2006 in a three-movie, 2-disc set along Lassie Come Home and Courage of Lassie.

Reception 
Bosley Crowther in The New York Times of June 11, 1945, felt the sequel to Lassie Come Home fell short of "being a worthy heir to the champion."

Variety characterized the principal actors as "excellent" but the film was "sticky sentiment, and flamboyant adventures, carry[ing] sufficient interest to move it along."

References

Notes

Bibliography 

 Collins, Ace. Lassie: A Dog's Life, The First Fifty Years. New York: Penguin Books, 1993. .
 Farmer, James H. Celluloid Wings. Blue Ridge Summit, Pennsylvania: Tab Books, 1984. .   
 Haines, Richard W. Technicolor Movies: The History of Dye Transfer Printing. Jefferson, North Carolina: McFarland & Company, 2003. .
 Junker, Reynold Joseph Paul. Subway Music. Bloomington, Indiana: Iuniverse, 2005. .

External links 
 
 
 
 
 

1945 films
Films shot in British Columbia
American aviation films
Films directed by S. Sylvan Simon
Films scored by Herbert Stothart
Lassie films
Metro-Goldwyn-Mayer films
1945 drama films
Films shot in Alberta
American drama films
Films set in Norway
Norwegian campaign
World War II films made in wartime